Murdi (also Romanized as Mūrdī) is a village in Anarestan Rural District, Riz District, Jam County, Bushehr Province, Iran. At the 2006 census, its population was 38, in 10 families.

References 

Populated places in Jam County